Tabrik (also Romanized as Tabrīk and Tabārīk; also known as Tabarrīk Javānlu and Tabrik-e Javanlu) is a village in Shirin Darreh Rural District, in the Central District of Quchan County, Razavi Khorasan Province, Iran. At the 2006 census, its population was 49, in 13 families.

References 

Populated places in Quchan County